"Could I Have This Kiss Forever" is a mid-tempo duet performed by American singer Whitney Houston and Spanish singer Enrique Iglesias. It was written by Diane Warren and produced by David Foster, Mark Taylor and Brian Rawling. The song first appeared on Iglesias's debut English-language album Enrique (1999) as a slow Latin-styled ballad. It was also included on Houston's first compilation album, Whitney: The Greatest Hits (2000). It achieved chart success in many countries, including Switzerland and the Netherlands, where it reached number one.

Background and release

Houston and Iglesias had never actually met in person, as both of them originally recorded the song in separate studios: Houston in Hamburg, Germany and Iglesias in Los Angeles, California. The two eventually met in the studio when the song was being re-recorded for single release by Metro, resulting in the new version being mid-tempo. The new version was released by Houston's label as the first US single (second UK single) from her greatest hits collection Whitney: The Greatest Hits (2000). For Iglesias, the song was the fourth single (third in the UK) from his album Enrique. It is also available on his Greatest Hits compilation released in 2008.

"Clive Davis and I were talking about this song that I'd heard a demo of and loved. And he says, 'Why don't you do it with Whitney?' So we did, and it turned out fantastic. Clive was very nice about letting Whitney sing with me — I'm not even an Arista artist.", Iglesias explained.

Critical reception
 Billboard wrote that "While the pairing of evergreen pop/R&B superstar Houston with blossoming Latin sensation Iglesias may seem a curious combination at first, go once through this midtempo Spanish guitar-laced crowd-pleaser and the magic is crystal clear. Iglesias is, of course, right at home, sounding as sensual and breezy as ever, while Houston delivers a restrained performance that perfectly captures a romantic moment made just for champagne and dancing." 
 J. D. Considine of The Baltimore Sun felt that "Could I Have This Kiss Forever" is a song on which Houston is "desperately trying to out-emote Enrique Iglesias". 
 The Daily Vault's Michael R. Smith stated that Houston "brings out the vocalist in Enrique with the sterling duet". 
 LA Weekly in its review for Whitney: The Greatest Hits commented that "Iglesias pants and sighs his way through his lines, trying to smolder but whimpering instead". 
 Jim Farber of the New York Daily News wrote that the song "makes cynical use of the Latin crossover craze." 
 Elysa Gardner of Vibe said that the song is "sinuous" and "latin-flavored" and that "Houston easily outclasses" her duet partner. 
 Christine Galera of The Orlando Sentinel was of the opinion that Houston's "bad" duet with Enrique Iglesias "sounds like every other Iglesias single I've heard". 
 NME wrote in reference to the song title that there might be "hygiene issues" but "if it puts a stop to their singing, then it should be encouraged – although, as someone appears to be strangling Enrique here, yet still he ploughs on, an eternal kiss with Whitney would probably be no barrier to song". The review continued negatively stating that "it's rather disappointing to hear that this Latin-tinged, sickly-stringed sob of a ballad is where she's at musically", "we get an insipid drip of romantic gormlessness and a catalogue of cliche as deep as a river, as high as a mountain, that you'd have to be really serotonin-deficient to find affecting". 
 Digital Spy in its review for Iglesias' Greatest Hits collection wrote that Iglesias has recorded "truly horrendeous" duets, "Could I Have This Kiss Forever" being "the worst offender".

In 2012, it was placed at number 1 on Idolator's list of "Whitney Houston's 10 Best Songs That Radio Forgot" because "this slow-burning mid-tempo number brims over with a sexy vibe, thanks to the singer's duet partner Enrique Iglesias and an understated-but-effective remix by then-hot production team Metro".

Music video
The video for "Could I Have This Kiss Forever" was directed by Francis Lawrence. Entertainment Tonight aired the world premiere of the video on June 22, 2000.
A young Krysten Ritter appears as an extra in the video.

Chart performance
The song was successful internationally, hitting number one in several countries worldwide, including the Netherlands and Switzerland. It also hit the top ten in many other countries, and attained Gold status in Australia, Germany, and Switzerland. It reached the top ten European chart. It reached number 52 on the US Billboard Hot 100. In Finland, it peaked at number 17. In Iceland, it peaked at number two and also in Sweden, where the song spent 19 weeks on the chart. It was certified platinum by the Swedish Recording Industry Association. In Ireland, it peaked at number eight and spent seven weeks on the chart. In Austria, it peaked at number eight and spent 20 weeks on the chart. In Ireland, it debuted and peaked at number 8. As of 2012, the song had sold 140 000 copies in the United Kingdom.

Track listings and formats

Australia CD maxi single
 "Could I Have This Kiss Forever" (Metro mix) – 3:55
 "I'm Your Baby Tonight" (Dronez mix) – 5:03
 "I'm Every Woman" (Clivillés & Cole mix) – 4:31
 "Queen of the Night" (CJ Mackintosh mix) – 5:19

Canadian CD maxi single
 "Could I Have This Kiss Forever" (Metro radio mix) – 3:55
 "Could I Have This Kiss Forever" (original version) – 4:21
 "Love Will Save the Day" (Jellybean & David Morales 1987 Classic Underground mix) – 7:30

European CD single
 "Could I Have This Kiss Forever" (Metro mix) – 3:55
 "Could I Have This Kiss Forever" (original version) – 4:21

European CD maxi single
 "Could I Have This Kiss Forever" (Metro mix) – 3:55
 "Could I Have This Kiss Forever" (original version) – 4:21
 "Could I Have This Kiss Forever" (Tin Tin Out mix) – 4:04
 "Could I Have This Kiss Forever" (Tin Tin Out mix edit) – 3:38
 "If I Told You That" (Johnny Douglas mix) – 4:48
 "I'm Every Woman" (Clivillés & Cole mix) – 4:31

Europe 12-inch vinyl single
A1: "Could I Have This Kiss Forever" (Metro mix) – 3:55
A2: "Could I Have This Kiss Forever" (Tin Tin Out mix edit) – 3:38
A3: "Could I Have This Kiss Forever" (original version) – 4:21
B1: "Could I Have This Kiss Forever" (Tin Tin Out mix) – 4:02
B2: "If I Told You That" (Johnny Douglas mix) – 4:48

Charts

Weekly charts

Year-end charts

Certifications

Release history

See also
List of European number-one hits of 2000
Dutch Top 40 number-one hits of 2000
List of number-one hits of 2000 (Switzerland)
List of UK top 10 singles in 2000

References

External links
 Could I Have This Kiss Forever at whitneyhouston.com
 Could I Have This Kiss Forever at Discogs

Songs about kissing
2000 singles
Enrique Iglesias songs
European Hot 100 Singles number-one singles
Dutch Top 40 number-one singles
Number-one singles in Switzerland
Songs written by Diane Warren
Pop ballads
Male–female vocal duets
Whitney Houston songs
Music videos directed by Francis Lawrence
Song recordings produced by David Foster
1999 songs
2000 songs
2000s ballads